Paul Marin, also known as Pablo Marin, is a Belizean politician. He has represented the Corozal Bay constituency in the Belize House since 2008. A member of the United Democratic Party, he is the current Minister of Health of Belize. In 2010, he received a United Nations award for excellence in public service.

References

Year of birth missing (living people)
Living people
United Democratic Party (Belize) politicians
Government ministers of Belize
Members of the Belize House of Representatives for Belize Rural North